Dhori virus (DHOV) is a species of the genus Thogotovirus and a member of the family Orthomyxoviridae. Its hosts are ticks, mosquitoes, and mammals (including humans). DHOV is lethal to mice, causing systemic pathologic changes similar to those reported in humans with virulent influenza A (H5N1) virus infection.

Batken virus (BKNV) is considered a subtype of DHOV. Serological cross-reactions between BKNV and DHOV indicate a phylogenetic relationship between these viruses.

References

Orthomyxoviridae